Sulu-Kuak (Hıwlıqıwaq) is a rural locality (a village) in Adzitarovsky Selsoviet, Karmaskalinsky District, Bashkortostan, Russia. The population was 44 as of 2010. There is 1 street.

Geography 
Sulu-Kuak is located 36 km west of Karmaskaly (the district's administrative centre) by road. Yakty-Yalan and Kushkul are the nearest rural localities.

References 

Rural localities in Karmaskalinsky District